Malden Rushett is a small village in the Royal Borough of Kingston upon Thames, London. It is located at the southernmost tip of the Royal Borough, surrounded by woodland and farmland, and between the larger suburban villages and towns of Claygate, Chessington, Epsom, Ashtead, Leatherhead and Oxshott.

History
Rushett was a detached part of the parish of Malden, located approximately 5 miles southwest of the main parish. On 24 March 1884 it was transferred to the parish of Chessington.

Facilities
Malden Rushett sits on the crossroads of the A243 road from Kingston upon Thames to Leatherhead and the B280 from Oxshott to Epsom. It consists of a few houses, two pubs and a petrol station incorporating an M&S Simply Food shop. It is two miles from Junction 9 on the M25 motorway.

The area also houses the Explorer Gate (south entrance and car park) of Chessington World of Adventures & Zoo Resort.

Rushett Common
South of Malden Rushett is Rushett Common, consisting of two strips of woodland alongside the A243 to the edge of the boundary between Greater London and Surrey. These are bounded by the Surrey woodlands of Princes Covert to the west and Epsom Common to the east. Within Rushett Common is Telegraph Hill – earlier known as Cabbage Hill –  which was the site of a station on the Admiralty Shutter telegraph line. This used the shutter system to communicate between London and Portsmouth from 1796 until 1816. The buildings were small two-roomed wooden huts with a frame which held the six wooden shutters. The station was replaced by a semaphore station built at Claygate.

Education

Transport and locale
Malden Rushett was due to have had a railway station built as part of the Southern Railway's extension from Motspur Park to Leatherhead via Chessington. The line reached Chessington South in 1939 and work was well underway on the final part of the line to Malden Rushett and Leatherhead, which was expected to stimulate further housing development beyond Chessington. The railway was extended beyond Chessington South station as far as Chalky Lane, with a bridge built over this road. Work was halted due to the outbreak of World War II, although the Royal Engineers did build a further railway embankment south of Chalky Lane which went as far as Chessington Wood and, probably, not far from the location where Malden Rushett station would have been built.

Following the introduction after the war of Green Belt legislation, little housing development could take place beyond Chessington South. Thus, the revenue earned from a station at Malden Rushett would have been minimal and the work was abandoned.

The village is now served by the London Buses route 465, while route 65 terminates at the nearby Chessington World of Adventures as part of its night route, with route 71 also terminating there.

Nearby places
Chessington
Epsom
Leatherhead
Oxshott
Esher
Tolworth
Surbiton
Kingston upon Thames

Nearest railway stations
Chessington South railway station
Chessington North railway station

Bus routes
London Buses route 465

Prominent residents
 Andrew Mackinlay

References

Areas of London
Districts of the Royal Borough of Kingston upon Thames